Chester Harvey Rowell (November 1, 1867 - April 12, 1948) was an early leader of the progressive movement in California.

Born in Bloomington, Illinois, he earned a degree from the University of Michigan in 1888. His father was Jonathan H. Rowell, a U.S. congressman in Illinois.

Rowell studied three years in Europe, including terms at the Universities of Halle, Berlin, Paris and Rome. In 1898 he became the editor and manager of the Fresno Morning Republican, the newspaper founded by his uncle Dr. Chester Rowell. He remained as editor for 22 years.

In 1907, he was the co-founder and chairman (1907-1911) of the Lincoln-Roosevelt League, a coalition of progressive Republican activists. The league was instrumental in the election of Hiram Johnson as governor of California. In 1912, Rowell was a member of the sub-committee that wrote the national platforms for both the Republican and Progressive parties.

Later, Rowell was a lecturer in journalism at the University of California, Berkeley (1911) and in political science at Stanford University (1927-1934). He was editor of the San Francisco Chronicle (1932-1939). He was a member of the University of California Board of Regents from 1914 until shortly before his death in 1948.

He took an interest in the popularization of science. He also served on the board of trustees for Science Service, now known as Society for Science & the Public, from 1921-1923.

Rowell is sometimes confused with his uncle, Dr. Chester Rowell (1844-1912), a Fresno physician, California State Senator (1880-1882, 1899-1901, 1903–1905), University of California regent (1891-1912), and mayor of Fresno (1909-1912).

Notes

References

Starr, Kevin, Inventing the Dream California Through the Progressive Era, Oxford University Press (1985), chap. 8
Winchell, L.A., History of Fresno County and the San Joaquin Valley (1933), p. 290-291
 https://web.archive.org/web/20131002130533/http://sunsite.berkeley.edu/~ucalhist/general_history/overview/regents/biographies_r.html

External links
Guide to the Chester H. Rowell Papers at The Bancroft Library

1867 births
1948 deaths
People from Bloomington, Illinois
Stanford University Department of Political Science faculty
University of Michigan alumni
California Progressives (1912)
California Republicans